The Cupa Ligii 1998 was the first season of the Cupa Ligii. The final took place at ANEFS Stadium in Bucharest.

Round 1

Final

Notes

1998
Cupa